Oulu Castle was a late defense castle in Oulu, Finland. It was built on an island in the delta of Oulu River in 1590. The castle was mostly made of wood and earth walls. There probably was an earlier medieval castle on the same site latest by 1375. The Russian Sophia Chronicle has recorded that men from Novgorod tried to conquer a new castle in the Oulu River delta in 1377 but were unsuccessful.

The present-day ruins on the Linnansaari island remain from an even later castle, which was built in 1605 by order of King Charles IX. The king's power of attorney of April 8, 1605, first orders the construction of Kajaani Castle and then orders the rebuilding of Oulu Castle. According to the order, the old wooden structures had to be demolished and a rampart with fire shelters had to be built around the island.

The castle was badly damaged in 1715, when Russian forces burned it during the Great Northern War. Final destruction of the castle took place on July 31, 1793, at 10:45 p.m., when lightning set the other one of the powder magazines on fire; as a result, the powder cellar exploded and destroyed the building almost completely.

Wooden constructions on the remaining powder magazine date from 1875 when the Oulu School of Sea Captains built their observatory on the site. The building was designed by architect Wolmar Westling. The building has been a cafeteria since 1912 with a small exhibition on the castle history.

See also
 Brahe Castle
 Kajaani Castle

References

External links

 Oulu Castle history 
 Oulu Castle’s stone cellar - Visit Oulu 

Castles in Finland
Castle
Buildings and structures in Oulu
Koskikeskus